The black-ringed white-eye or lemon-throated white-eye (Zosterops anomalus) is a species of bird in the family Zosteropidae. It is endemic to Sulawesi, Indonesia. Its natural habitat is subtropical or tropical moist lowland forests.

References

Birds described in 1896
Endemic birds of Sulawesi
Zosterops
Taxonomy articles created by Polbot